Smithiantha zebrina  is the first Smithiantha species that was used for horticulture. It has red and yellow spotted flowers and dark green leaves. The species is native to eastern Mexico.

References

Gesnerioideae